ESPN Radio 1450 may refer to:

 WLEJ (AM) serving the State College, Pennsylvania, market
 WIBM serving the Jackson, Michigan, market